D. J. Davidson (born September 19, 1997) is an American football nose tackle for the New York Giants of the National Football League (NFL). He was selected in the fifth round, 147th overall, of the 2022 NFL Draft. He played college football at Arizona State.

High school
Davidson played for Desert Ridge as a Defensive tackle. As a junior he recorded 57 tackles, four sacks, and two forced fumbles. As a senior he played in 13 games as a senior, recording 67 total tackles, 19.5 tackles for loss, 5.5 sacks, four forced fumbles, and two fumble recoveries, including one returned for a touchdown, and led his team to the state championship game his senior season. Scouts rated him as a three-star prospect.

College career
Davidson played for Arizona State. As a freshman he suffered a season ending injury and only played 8 games with 10 tackles, 3.5 tackles for loss, and two sacks. As a sophomore he started 12 of 13 games and had 51 tackles, 4 tackles for loss, 1.5 sacks, and 1 touchdown. As a junior he had 15 tackles and 1 sack. His senior year he had 57 tackles, 6 tackles for loss, with 4 pass deflections, and was named the Curley Culp Outstanding defensive linemen.

Professional career

Davidson was drafted by the New York Giants with the 147th pick in the fifth round of the 2022 NFL Draft. On October 11, 2022, Davidson was placed on injured reserve after he tore his ACL against the Green Bay Packers in Week 5.

References

External links
 New York Giants bio
 Arizona State Sun Devils bio

1999 births
Living people
Players of American football from Arizona
Sportspeople from Mesa, Arizona
American football defensive tackles
Arizona State Sun Devils football players
New York Giants players